Mike Werb is an American screenwriter, whose writing credits include Face/Off, The Mask and the story for Lara Croft: Tomb Raider.

A Los Angeles native, Werb attended Stanford. He is a UCLA Film School graduate.

He has worked as a collaborator with Michael Colleary. The duo won a Saturn Award for Best Writing for Face/Off in 1998. They previously worked on projects "Top Ten", "Stretch Armstrong" and "King's Ransom" (the latter one for director John Woo), but neither of these films were produced. He is the creator of Unnatural History.

Credits

Film

Television
The numbers in writing credits refer to the number of episodes.

References

External links

Film producers from California
American male screenwriters
Television producers from California
American television writers
Living people
Writers from Los Angeles
Stanford University alumni
UCLA Film School alumni
Year of birth missing (living people)
American male television writers
Screenwriters from California